The 2020–21 South Florida Bulls men's basketball team represented the University of South Florida during the 2020–21 NCAA Division I men's basketball season. The season marked the 49th basketball season for USF, the eighth as a member of the American Athletic Conference, and the fourth season under head coach Brian Gregory. The Bulls play their home games at Yuengling Center on the university's Tampa, Florida campus. The season ended on March 12, 2021 with a 68–67 loss to regular season conference champion Wichita State in the second round of the AAC tournament.

Previous season
The Bulls finished the 2019–20 season 14–17, 7–11 in AAC play to finish in ninth place. They entered as the No. 9 seed in the AAC tournament, which was ultimately cancelled due to the coronavirus pandemic.

Offseason

Departures

Incoming transfers

2020 recruiting class

2021 recruiting class

Preseason

AAC preseason media poll

On October 28, The American released the preseason Poll and other preseason awards

Preseason Awards
 All-AAC Second Team - Alexis Yetna

Roster

Schedule and results

COVID-19 impact

Due to the ongoing COVID-19 pandemic, the Bulls' schedule is subject to change, including the cancellation or postponement of individual games, the cancellation of the entire season, or games played either with minimal fans or without fans in attendance and just essential personnel.

The game vs. Florida A&M scheduled for December 4th was cancelled due to COVID-19 issues.
USF was originally scheduled to play LSU instead of Wofford on December 12th, but LSU pulled out of the Hoopsgiving event due to COVID-19. 
The game vs. Temple rescheduled for February 21st was moved to Philadelphia.
The game vs. SMU scheduled for February 20th was moved to Dallas.
The game @ Temple scheduled for February 24th was moved to Tampa.

Schedule

|-
!colspan=12 style=| Regular season
|-

|-
!colspan=12 style=| AAC tournament
|-

|-

Awards and honors

AAC Player of the Week
Week 3 – David Collins

AAC Freshman of the Week
Week 5 – Caleb Murphy
Week 6 – Caleb Murphy

AAC All-Freshman Team 
Caleb Murphy

See also
2020–21 South Florida Bulls women's basketball team

References

South Florida Bulls men's basketball seasons
South Florida Bulls
South Florida Bulls men's b
South Florida Bulls men's b